N-Ethyltryptamine (NET), or merely ethyltryptamine, is a tryptamine that is structurally related to  N-methyltryptamine (NMT) and the psychedelic drugs N,N-dimethyltryptamine (DMT) and N,N-diethyltryptamine (DET).

See also 
 N-Methyltryptamine (NMT)
 N,N,-Dimethyltryptamine (DMT)

References 

Tryptamines
Serotonin receptor agonists